Madhuban Mathaul  is a village development committee in Parsa District in the Narayani Zone of southern Nepal. At the time of the 2011 Nepal census it had a population of 6,783 people living in 1246 individual households. There were 3,394 males and  3,389 females at the time of census.

References

Populated places in Parsa District